Timur Igorevich Osmolovskiy (born 28 May 2000) is a Russian football player.

Club career
He made his debut in the Russian Football National League for FC Spartak-2 Moscow on 27 August 2020 in a game against FC Krasnodar-2.

References

External links
 
 Profile by Russian Football National League
 

2000 births
Sportspeople from Adygea
Living people
Russian footballers
Russia youth international footballers
Association football forwards
FC Akhmat Grozny players
PFC CSKA Moscow players
FC Spartak-2 Moscow players
FC Strogino Moscow players
People from Maykop